Cone Nunatak is a nunatak,  high, which appears conical on its north side but has brown rock cliffs on its south face, lying  south-southeast of Buttress Hill on the Tabarin Peninsula, at the northeast extremity of the Antarctic Peninsula. It represents a volcanic vent of the James Ross Island Volcanic Group.

The descriptive name was applied by the Falkland Islands Dependencies Survey following their survey of the area in 1946.

References 

Nunataks of Trinity Peninsula
Volcanoes of Graham Land